Kintampo is a town and tourist destination in the Bono East Region of Ghana. It became the capital of Kintampo North Municipal in 2004. Kintampo has a population of 111 000. It also served as the capital of the former Kintampo District. Kintampo also has a Senior High School which is located at Kyeremankoma. There is a college of health called Kintampo College of Health and Well-being (CoHK) in the town. Most of the population in Kintampo are farmers, with production focused on yams, maize, legumes, tubers and other vegetables. Both the Bono and the Mo tribe are indigenous to the region. Kintampo is a cosmopolitan town, apart from the indigenous tribe, other tribes like the Wangaras, Gonjas , Konkombas and others are also inhabitants of the town. The annual Benkadi Kurubi festival of the Wangara community in Ghana always takes place at Kintampo.

Health 

 Kintampo Government Hospital

Economic activities

Tourism 
Kintampo is one of the tourist hubs of Ghana. There are several tourist attraction sites in the town notable among them are; Kintampo waterfalls, Kintampo Fuller Falls. However, another iconic monument that has put the town on the tourism map is the Centre of Ghana site.

Farming 
Farming is the major occupation among the entire population of Kintampo. Most farmers here had turned the vast arable lands into cashew and mango plantations, making the town one of the leading cultivators of these crops. A lot more are also into food crops such as yam, cassava, maize, beans and vegetables.

Sifting cultivation or slash and burn, a farming system in which forests are burnt, releasing nutrients to support cultivation of annual and then perennial crops for a period of several years is the most used system in Kintampo.

Commercial activities

Notable people 
 Victoria Nyame, Member of Parliament

References 

Populated places in the Bono East Region